Chickenley Heath railway station served the village of Chickenley, in the historical county of West Riding of Yorkshire, England, from 1877 to 1909 on the West Yorkshire Railway.

History 
The station was opened on 2 July 1877 on the Great Northern Railway. When the Dewsbury loop opened in 1880, this station lost a lot of its traffic due to the trains being diverted, so it closed on 1 July 1909.

References

External links 

Disused railway stations in West Yorkshire
Former Great Northern Railway stations
Railway stations in Great Britain opened in 1877
Railway stations in Great Britain closed in 1909
1877 establishments in England
1909 disestablishments in England